Gairdner is a surname. Notable people with the surname include:

 Alice Elizabeth Gairdner (1873–1954), British plant scientist, geneticist and cytologist
 Charles Gairdner (1898–1983), British Governor of Western Australia and Tasmania
 James Gairdner, British historian
 William Gairdner (disambiguation), multiple people